Bruce Mitchell Nash (born August 14, 1947) is an American reality television producer.

Nash first entered reality TV with Before They Were Stars. His credits include the Sci Fi Channel series Who Wants to Be a Superhero? with Stan Lee; World's Most Amazing Videos for NBC and Spike TV; Most Shocking as well as Most Daring for Court TV/truTV; Amazing Sports Stories for Fox Sports Net, which garnered four Sports Emmy nominations; Haunted Lives: True Ghost Stories for CBS, NBC's For Love or Money; Who Wants To Marry My Dad?, ABC Family's 2003 version of Dance Fever with Merv Griffin Entertainment and Bob Bain Productions, and Meet My Folks.  He is also the creator of Modern Marvels.

References

1947 births
Living people
Place of birth missing (living people)
American reality television producers